The Percha Creek Bridge near Hillsboro, New Mexico formerly brought New Mexico State Road 90 NM 90 over Percha Creek.

It was built in 1927.  It was bypassed in 1995 but preserved by the NMSHTD, and it was listed on the National Register of Historic Places in 1997.

It is a single span Warren design steel deck truss bridge, built by the Ware Company of El Paso.

It has a timber deck, covered with asphalt.

William S. Henderson was the engineer.

The bridge was deemed significant in part as "the oldest and highest rated bridge Warren design steel deck truss bridge in New Mexico, embodying the design, materials and methods of construction associated with that bridge sub-type."

References

External links

Bridges in New Mexico
National Register of Historic Places in Sierra County, New Mexico
Buildings and structures completed in 1927